Costaclavin is an ergoline fungal isolate, chemically related to festuclavine.

References

Alkaloids found in fungi
Ergolines